Jesse Ross "J. R." Williams (November 17, 1940 – September 17, 2015) was a Canadian football player who played for the BC Lions. He won the Grey Cup with them in 1964. He played college football at Fresno State University and Bakersfield College. Williams was inducted into the Bob Elias Kern County Sports Hall of Fame in 2001. After his football career he was a football coach, coaching at Arvin High School and Highland High School in Bakersfield. He died in 2015.

References

1940 births
2015 deaths
Bakersfield College alumni
BC Lions players
California State University, Fresno alumni
Fresno State Bulldogs football players
People from Corcoran, California